Vevey District was a  district in the canton of Vaud in Switzerland. The seat of the district was the city of Vevey. It has been dissolved on 1 January 2008 and merged into the new Riviera-Pays-d'Enhaut district.

Mergers and name changes
 On 1 January 1962 the former municipalities of Montreux-Châtelard and Montreux-Planches merged to form the new municipality of Montreux.  
 On 1 September 2006 the municipalities of Blonay, Chardonne, Corseaux, Corsier-sur-Vevey, Jongny, Montreux, Saint-Légier-La Chiésaz, La Tour-de-Peilz, Vevey and Veytaux came from the District de Vevey to join the Riviera-Pays-d'Enhaut District.

Municipalities
The following municipalities were located in the district at its dissolution:

 Blonay
 Chardonne
 Corseaux
 Corsier-sur-Vevey
 Jongny
 La Tour-de-Peilz
 Montreux
 Saint-Légier-La Chiésaz
 Vevey
 Veytaux

References

Former districts of the canton of Vaud